Club Rivadavia is an Argentine football club from Lincoln, Buenos Aires. The squad currently plays in Torneo Argentino A, the regionalised third division of the Argentine football league system.

At the end of the 2005–06 season Rivadavia was promoted to Argentino A via the promotion/relegation playoff. The team beat Racing de Olavarría 2–1 on aggregate to secure promotion.

See also
List of football clubs in Argentina
Argentine football league system

External links

Official website

Association football clubs established in 1915
Football clubs in Buenos Aires Province
Lincoln, Buenos Aires
1915 establishments in Argentina